Dimethyl ether (DME; also known as methoxymethane) is the organic compound with the formula CH3OCH3, 
(sometimes ambiguously simplified to C2H6O as it is an isomer of ethanol). The simplest ether, it is a colorless gas that is a useful precursor to other organic compounds and an aerosol propellant that is currently being demonstrated for use in a variety of fuel applications. It is an isomer of ethanol.

Dimethyl ether was first synthesised by Jean-Baptiste Dumas and Eugene Péligot in 1835 by distillation of methanol and sulfuric acid.

Production
Approximately 50,000 tons were produced in 1985 in Western Europe by dehydration of methanol:
2 CH3OH → (CH3)2O + H2O
The required methanol is obtained from synthesis gas (syngas).  Other possible improvements call for a dual catalyst system that permits both methanol synthesis and dehydration in the same process unit, with no methanol isolation and purification.
Both the one-step and two-step processes above are commercially available. The two-step process is relatively simple and start-up costs are relatively low. A one-step liquid-phase process is in development.

From biomass
Dimethyl ether is a synthetic second generation biofuel (BioDME), which can be produced from lignocellulosic biomass. The EU is considering BioDME in its potential biofuel mix in 2030; It can also be made from biogas or methane from animal, food, and agricultural waste, or even from shale gas or natural gas.

The Volvo Group is the coordinator for the European Community Seventh Framework Programme project BioDME where Chemrec's BioDME pilot plant is based on black liquor gasification in Piteå, Sweden.

Applications
The largest use of dimethyl ether is as the feedstock for the production of the methylating agent, dimethyl sulfate, which entails its reaction with sulfur trioxide:
  +  → 
Dimethyl ether can also be converted into acetic acid using carbonylation technology related to the Monsanto acetic acid process:
  + 2 CO + H2O → 2 CH3CO2H

Laboratory reagent and solvent
Dimethyl ether is a low-temperature solvent and extraction agent, applicable to specialised laboratory procedures. Its usefulness is limited by its low boiling point, but the same property facilitates its removal from reaction mixtures. Dimethyl ether is the precursor to the useful alkylating agent, trimethyloxonium tetrafluoroborate.

Niche applications
A mixture of dimethyl ether and propane is used in some over-the-counter "freeze spray" products to treat warts, by freezing them. In this role, it has supplanted halocarbon compounds (Freon).

Dimethyl ether is also a component of certain high temperature "Map-Pro" blowtorch gas blends, supplanting the use of methyl acetylene and propadiene mixtures.

Dimethyl ether is also used as a propellant in aerosol products. Such products include hair spray, bug spray and some aerosol glue products.

Research

Fuel

A potentially major use of dimethyl ether is as substitute for propane in LPG used as fuel in household and industry. Dimethyl ether can also be used as a blendstock in propane autogas.

It is also a promising fuel in diesel engines, and gas turbines. For diesel engines, an advantage is the high cetane number of 55, compared to that of diesel fuel from petroleum, which is 40–53. Only moderate modifications are needed to convert a diesel engine to burn dimethyl ether. The simplicity of this short carbon chain compound leads during combustion to very low emissions of particulate matter. For these reasons as well as being sulfur-free, dimethyl ether meets even the most stringent emission regulations in Europe (EURO5), U.S. (U.S. 2010), and Japan (2009 Japan).

At the European Shell Eco Marathon, an unofficial World Championship for mileage, vehicle running on 100% dimethyl ether drove 589 km/liter (169.8 cm3/100 km), fuel equivalent to gasoline with a 50 cm3 displacement 2-stroke engine. As well as winning they beat the old standing record of 306 km/liter (326.8 cm3/100 km), set by the same team in 2007.

To study the dimethyl ether for the combustion process a chemical kinetic mechanism is required which can be used for Computational fluid dynamics  calculation.

Refrigerant 
Dimethyl ether is a refrigerant with ASHRAE refrigerant designation R-E170. It is also used in refrigerant blends with e.g. ammonia, carbon dioxide, butane and propene.
Dimethyl ether was the first refrigerant. In 1876, the French engineer Charles Tellier bought the ex-Elder-Dempster a 690 tons cargo ship Eboe and fitted a methyl-ether refrigerating plant of his design. The ship was renamed Le Frigorifique and successfully imported a cargo of refrigerated meat from Argentina. However the machinery could be improved and in 1877 another refrigerated ship called Paraguay with a refrigerating plant improved by Ferdinand Carré was put into service on the South American run.

Safety
Unlike other alkyl ethers, dimethyl ether resists autoxidation. Dimethyl ether is also relatively non-toxic, although it is highly flammable. BASF Explosion Disaster on July 28, 1948 in Ludwigshafen was caused by this compound – 200 people died, a third of the industrial plant was destroyed.

Data sheet

Routes to produce dimethyl ether

Vapor pressure

Experimental vapor pressures of dimethyl ether

See also
 Methanol economy

References

External links 
 The International DME Association
 NOAA site for NFPA 704
 XTL & DME Institute

Aerosol propellants
Dialkyl ethers
Fuels
Synthetic fuels
Symmetrical ethers
Organic compounds with 2 carbon atoms